Amphiprion is a genus of ray-finned fish which comprises all but one of the species of clownfish or anemonefish in the subfamily Amphiprioninae of the family Pomacentridae.

Species
The following species are classified in the genus Amphiprion:

 Amphiprion akallopisos Bleeker, 1853 (Skunk clownfish)
 Amphiprion akindynos Allen, 1972 (Barrier reef anemonefish)
 Amphiprion allardi Klausewitz, 1970 (Twobar anemonefish)
 Amphiprion barberi Allen, Drew & Kaufman, 2008
 Amphiprion bicinctus Rüppell, 1830 (Twoband anemonefish)
 Amphiprion chagosensis Allen, 1972 (Chagos anemonefish)
 Amphiprion chrysogaster Cuvier, 1830 (Mauritian anemonefish)
 Amphiprion chrysopterus Cuvier, 1830 (Orangefin anemonefish) 
 Amphiprion clarkii (J. W. Bennett, 1830) (Yellowtail clownfish)
 Amphiprion ephippium (Bloch, 1790) (Saddle anemonefish)
 Amphiprion frenatus Brevoort, 1856 (Tomato clownfish)
 Amphiprion fuscocaudatus Allen, 1972 (Seychelles anemonefish)
 Amphiprion latezonatus Waite, 1900 (Wide-band Anemonefish)
 Amphiprion latifasciatus Allen, 1972 (Madagascar anemonefish)
 Amphiprion leucokranos Allen, 1973 (Whitebonnet anemonefish)
 Amphiprion mccullochi Whitley, 1929 (Whitesnout anemonefish)
 Amphiprion melanopus Bleeker, 1852 (Fire clownfish)
 Amphiprion nigripes Regan, 1908 (Maldive anemonefish)
 Amphiprion ocellaris Cuvier, 1830 (Clown anemonefish)
 Amphiprion omanensis Allen & Mee, 1991 (Oman anemonefish)
 Amphiprion pacificus Allen, Drew & Fenner, 2010 (Pacific anemonefish)
 Amphiprion percula (Lacepède, 1802) (Orange clownfish)
 Amphiprion perideraion Bleeker, 1855 (Pink anemonefish)
 Amphiprion polymnus (Linnaeus, 1758) (Saddleback clownfish)
 Amphiprion rubrocinctus Richardson, 1842 (Red Anemonefish)
 Amphiprion sandaracinos Allen, 1972 (Yellow clownfish)
 Amphiprion sebae Bleeker, 1853 (Sebae anemonefish)
 Amphiprion thiellei Burgess, 1981 (Thielle's anemonefish)
 Amphiprion tricinctus Schultz & Welander, 1953 (Three-band anemonefish)

References

 
Marine fish genera
Taxa named by Marcus Elieser Bloch
Taxa named by Johann Gottlob Theaenus Schneider
Pomacentridae